2017 Varsity Rugby was the 2017 edition of four rugby union competitions annually played between several university teams in South Africa. It was contested from 30 January to 17 April 2017 and was the tenth edition of these competitions.

Varsity Cup

Wits were promoted from the 2016 Varsity Shield to return to the Varsity Shield competition after a two-year absence.

Varsity Shield

Young Guns

Competition rules

There was nine participating universities in the 2017 Young Guns competition, the Under-20 sides of each of the nine Varsity Cup teams. These teams were divided into three regionalised pools and each team played every team in their pool twice over the course of the season, once at home and once away.

Teams received four points for a win and two points for a draw. Bonus points were awarded to teams that scored four or more tries in a game, as well as to teams that lost a match by eight points or less. Teams were ranked by log points, then points difference (points scored less points conceded).

The top four teams overall qualified for the title play-off semi-finals.

Teams

Standings

The final standings for the 2017 Varsity Cup Young Guns were:

Matches

The following matches were played in the 2017 Varsity Young Guns competition:

Round one

Round two

Round three

Round four

Round five

Round six

Round seven

Semi-finals

Final

Koshuis Rugby Championship

Competition rules

There was nine participating teams in the 2017 Steinhoff Koshuis Rugby Championship competition, the winners of the internal leagues of each of the nine Varsity Cup teams. These teams were divided into two pools (one with five teams and one with four teams) and each team played every team in their pool once over the course of the season, either at home or away.

Teams received four points for a win and two points for a draw. Bonus points were awarded to teams that scored four or more tries in a game, as well as to teams that lost a match by eight points or less. Teams were ranked by log points, then points difference (points scored less points conceded).

Three teams qualified for the title play-offs.

Teams

Standings

The final standings for the 2017 Steinhoff Koshuis Rugby Championship were:

Matches

The following matches were played in the 2017 Steinhoff Koshuis Rugby Championship competition:

Round one

Round two

Round three

Round four

Round five

Round six

Round seven

Final

See also

 Varsity Cup
 2017 Varsity Cup
 2017 Varsity Shield
 2017 Gold Cup

References

External links
 

2017
2017 in South African rugby union
2017 rugby union tournaments for clubs